The Beach Party at the Threshold of Hell is a 2006 American science fiction comedy film directed by Jonny Gillette, written and co-directed by Kevin Wheatley, and produced by Jamie Bullock and Ryan Turi. It stars Kevin Wheatley and Jamie Bullock, amongst others.

Plot
The film is set in New America in the year 2097, two decades after a nuclear apocalypse. Tex Kennedy, the last survivor of the Kennedy family, two robotic ex-secret service agents, and a female cannibal journey to find the "Threshold of Hell" to gain access to a radio tower to unite the survivors of the apocalypse.

Production and release
The movie premiered at the Los Angeles Film Festival on June 23, 2006 and then toured the country screening at various film festivals. The movie was picked up by National Lampoon for a theatrical release in October 2007.

Critical reaction
Rotten Tomatoes records an aggregate rating of 60% from 5 reviews. Village Voice found it "self-impressed film", and considered it an over-deliberate attempt to create a cult film, which failed, "funnier on paper than in reality", making a negative comparison to the Mad Max franchise.

Cast
Kevin Wheatley as Tex Kennedy
Paul Whitty as Quincy the Robot
Chandler Parker as Yul the Robot
Jamie Bullock as Cannibal Sue
Bill English as Benjamin Remington
Stewart Carrico as Zach/Thorn
Lea Coco as Vincent "Jackle" Remington
Alex Reznik as Yurik Schlatz (not his real name)
Ted Schneider as Marcellus St. Joan
Daniel Baldwin as Clark Remington
Morgan Carson as Ginsberg
Scott Addison Clay as Blowgun Child
Katherine Cunningham-Eves as Veronica
Henry Dittman as Sue Biographer
Katherine Flynn as Allison
Tony Hale as Remington Biographer
Callam Ingram as TV Son
Claire Lautier as TV Mom
J. P. Manoux as Sitcom Dad
Alcorn Minor as Xavier
Richard Riehle as Paranormal Historian
Jim Ryan as Henry Edison
Jane Seymour as President Lauren Coffey
Ryan Turi as Richie
Henry Vick as The Grashtowners
Andrew Walker as Franklin

References

External links
Official site
 

2006 films
2000s English-language films
2006 comedy films
Films set in the 2090s
2000s science fiction comedy films
American post-apocalyptic films
American science fiction comedy films
2097
2000s American films